Tackhead Tape Time is the debut album of Tackhead, released in 1987 through Nettwerk.

Composition

Tackhead Tape Time is a "robotic" electro-funk album, containing abrasive beats, funky guitar, and instances of tape delay, which hint at the album's dub and reggae roots. The album also boasts spliced, sampled speeches and quotes from the likes of Prime Minister Margaret Thatcher, downbeat news reports, military officers and televangelists, among other sources.

Track listing

Accolades

Personnel
Tackhead
Keith LeBlanc – instruments
Skip McDonald – instruments
Adrian Sherwood – instruments
Doug Wimbish – instruments
Additional musicians and production
Cesare – scratching on "Man in a Suitcase"
Gary Clail – mixing
Tackhead – producer

References

External links 
 

1987 debut albums
Tackhead albums
Nettwerk Records albums